Erika Heinicke (born 19 December 1939) is a retired German speed skater. She competed at the 1964 Winter Olympics in the 1000, 1500 and 3000 m events and finished in 23rd, 28th and 28th place, respectively. 

Personal bests:
500 m – 49.4 (1966)
 1000 m – 1:40.5 (1965)
 1500 m – 2:32.9 (1966)
 3000 m – 5:28.7 (1966)

References

1939 births
Living people
People from Bad Frankenhausen
German female speed skaters
Speed skaters at the 1964 Winter Olympics
Olympic speed skaters of the United Team of Germany
Sportspeople from Thuringia